The Embassy of the People's Republic of China in Canada (French: Ambassade de la République populaire de Chine au Canada) is the embassy of China in Ottawa, Ontario, Canada. China purchased the building at St. Patrick Street in 1972, soon after diplomatic relations were established between Canada and the PRC. The structure had been built by the Sisters of Good Shepherd who had used it as a convent for several decades. The Chinese government paid some $1.6 million for it. In the mid-1980s a major expansion of the structure was completed. The embassy is located in the Lower Town neighbourhood with the rear of the embassy looking out on the Rideau River.

The early years of the embassy were somewhat strained. Few diplomats, and even the first ambassador did not speak English. Canada insisted that the staff members be subjected to fairly rigid travel rules for security reasons. During this period there was also a steady stream of defections among the diplomatic staff.

In recent years the embassy has become one of Ottawa's largest and busiest. It is still the subject of frequent protests, and those protesting the treatment of Falun Gong are sporadically stationed across the street from the embassy.

Lu Shaye was the most recent ambassador and is leaving sometime in June 2019 to go to the Chinese embassy in Paris. In November 2019, Cong Peiwu was announced as the new ambassador.

See also
 List of diplomatic missions of China
 Canada–China relations

References

External links

Official site 

China
Ottawa
Canada–China relations